HAT LS2 (designation standing for "Landplane, Single engine, 2-seater) is a light airplane developed by Hellenic Aeronautical Technologies (HAT), a small Greek manufacturer of aerospace components. Design started in 1990 followed by prototype construction. After a temporary delay of the program, first flight of prototype (SX-LS2) was made on May 23, 1997. Air-worthiness certificate was awarded on September 2, 1999. The plane is a light two-seater sporting airplane constructed of fiber-reinforced composites, designed for sale in the form of construction plans.

Specifications (LS2)

References

Further reading

1990s Greek sport aircraft
Low-wing aircraft
Single-engined tractor aircraft
Aircraft first flown in 1997